Hani Al Saqer  is a Kuwaiti football forward who played for Kuwait in the 1996 Asian Cup. He also played for Al Qadesiya.

References

1973 births
Kuwaiti footballers
Living people
Asian Games medalists in football
Footballers at the 1998 Asian Games
Asian Games silver medalists for Kuwait
Association football forwards
Medalists at the 1998 Asian Games
Kuwait international footballers
Qadsia SC players
Kuwait Premier League managers
Kuwait Premier League players
Al-Yarmouk SC (Kuwait) managers
Khaitan SC managers